George Parrott Forbes (21 July 1914 – 28 November 1964) was an English professional footballer who made 179 appearances in the Football League playing as a centre half for Blackburn Rovers and Barrow either side of the Second World War. He also played non-league football for Crescent Road Congregational, Mossley, Hyde United and Hurst. Forbes was born in 1914 in Dukinfield, Cheshire, and died in 1964 at the age of 50 in Barrow-in-Furness, which was then in Lancashire.

References

1914 births
1964 deaths
People from Dukinfield
English footballers
Association football defenders
Mossley A.F.C. players
Hyde United F.C. players
Blackburn Rovers F.C. players
Ashton United F.C. players
Barrow A.F.C. players
English Football League players